Eurodance (sometimes referred to as Euro-NRG, Euro-electronica or Euro) is a genre of electronic dance music that originated in the late 1980s in Europe. It combines many elements of Rap, Techno and Euro Disco. This genre of music is heavily influenced by the use of rich vocals, sometimes with rapped verses. This, combined with cutting-edge synthesizers, strong bass rhythm and melodic hooks, establishes the core foundation of Eurodance music.

History

Background
Eurodance music originated in the late 1980s in central Europe, especially in Germany, where rave parties were becoming popular. By 1987, a German party scene was started by Tauseef Alam, based on the well established Chicago house sound and Belgian new beat in Frankfurt. The band Confetti's became one of the first to break through into mainstream music as a new beat act, their most successful period was 1988–1989 with international hits like "The Sound of C" and "C in China". The following year saw acid house making a significant impact on popular consciousness in Germany and central Europe as it had in England. In 1989, German DJs Westbam and Dr. Motte established the Ufo Club, an illegal party venue, and co-founded the Love Parade. The parade first occurred in July 1989, when 150 people took to the streets in Berlin. It was conceived as a political demonstration for peace and international understanding through love and music. On 19 July 1989, Black Box's single "Ride on Time" was released. The song spent six weeks at No. 1 in the United Kingdom and it was the UK's best-selling single of 1989. It contained the Korg M1's "house piano" which can be found in many Eurodance releases. On 27 September 1989, Technotronic's single "Pump Up the Jam" was released. It reached number one in Belgium and Spain, and it popularised the house variant called hip house in Europe. On 9 November 1989, the Berlin Wall fell; free underground techno parties mushroomed in East Berlin, and a rave scene comparable to that in the UK was established. East German DJ Paul van Dyk has remarked that the techno-based rave scene was a major force in re-establishing social connections between East and West Germany during the unification period. In the same year, German producers Michael Münzing and Luca Anzilotti (under the pseudonyms Benito Benites and John "Virgo" Garrett III) formed the Snap! project in Frankfurt. Snap! songs combined imported hip hop and soul vocals adding rhythm by using computer technology and mixing electronic sounds, bass and drums, mainly house music. By doing so a new genre was born: Eurodance.

Rise and fall
Snap!'s first single, "The Power", released in 1990, reached number one in the Netherlands, Spain, Switzerland and the United Kingdom, and it helped to raise awareness of the genre within Europe. In the following years, other Eurodance acts formed in Frankfurt, including Jam and Spoon, Intermission and Culture Beat. After the breakthrough single "Rhythm is a Dancer" by Snap! in 1992 (number 1 in 12 countries), new groups started to pop up all over Europe, mainly in Belgium, Netherlands and Italy. From 1992 till the decline of popularity after 1995, the sound became more and more NRG-oriented, leading to songs raising in B.P.M. up to 150. The notable songs which defined the genre in this period, dubbed as the "golden era" of Eurodance, are "It's My Life" by Dr. Alban in 1992 (number 1 in 8 countries), "No Limit" by Dutch group 2 Unlimited in 1993 (number 1 in 14 countries, it was Europe's biggest-selling song for 1993), "What Is Love" by Haddaway in the same year (number 1 in 13 countries), "Mr. Vain" by Culture Beat also in the same year (number 1 in 13 countries), "Cotton Eye Joe" by Rednex in 1994 (number 1 in 12 countries) and "Scatman (Ski-Ba-Bop-Ba-Dop-Bop)" by Scatman John in the same year (number 1 in 9 countries). In the same period the popularity of the genre also expanded further to East Asia, in nations such as Japan, South Korea and Taiwan; towards the end of the golden era also in Russia.

By 1995, Eurodance dominated European charts with 5 singles in the top 10 of the singles charts. Despite its success, many observers within the music industry said that the Eurodance sound had to change or die, and Eurodance producers and singers started to follow different paths and different sounds, such as happy hardcore and house music, but not all the groups followed this trend immediately. Notably, the group 2 Unlimited wanted to remain within Eurodance sounds in order to remain chartbusters, although the producer De Coster predicted a retreat from a poppy to a more clubby sound. Nevertheless, in the second half of the decade the popularity of Eurodance started to decline, and "Scatman's World" by Scatman John was the last major hit of the original Eurodance sound in the Eurochart Hot 100, being number 1 for 3 weeks between late August and early September 1995.

In late 1990s the classic Eurodance sound gradually morphed into progressive house. Notable examples of successful Eurodance songs of this era are "Coco Jamboo" by German band Mr. President in 1996, "Freed from Desire" and "Let a Boy Cry" by Italian singer Gala and "Bailando" by Paradisio in the same year, "Barbie Girl" by Danish-Norwegian group Aqua in 1997, "Boom, Boom, Boom, Boom!!" by Dutch group Vengaboys in 1998, "Blue (Da Ba Dee)" by Italian group Eiffel 65 in 1999 and "Around the World (La La La La La)" by German group ATC in 2000. Basshunter, Scooter and Cascada saw significant success during the 2000s, however, by the early 2010s, popularity waned, and by about 2012, Eurodance music disappeared almost completely from the majority of European radio airplay.

Definition
The term "Eurodance" gradually became associated with a specific style of European dance music. During its golden years in the mid-1990s, it was referred as "Euro-NRG"; in Europe it was often called "dancefloor".

While some use a much broader definition of what is considered "Eurodance", over time, the term particularly came to refer to an NRG-based genre from the 1990s which included a solo vocalist or a rapper/vocalist duet.

Characteristics of the music
Most Eurodance is characterized by synthesizer riffs, one or more vocals with simple chorus, one or more rap parts, sampling and a drum machine clap beat. Sometimes non-rap vocals are used. Giorgio Moroder, Donna Summer, and Silver Convention were early examples of pre Eurodance musicians. Swedish disco and pop group ABBA gained disco hits such as "Gimme Gimme Gimme", "Summer Night City", and "Voulez-Vous". 

Eurodance often carries a positive, upbeat attitude; the lyrics usually involve issues of love and peace, dancing and partying, or expressing and overcoming difficult emotions. The early to mid-1990s Eurodance vocals were frequently done by a solo vocalist or a mixed rapper-vocalist duet such as the male–female duets of 2 Unlimited, La Bouche and Magic Affair.

Many groups used variations of the rapper-vocalist theme, such as a German rapper with American singers (Real McCoy), or the use of reggae rap as in Ice MC and Fun Factory, or combination of rapper and reggae vocalist like in the Life in the Streets album, or scat singing as in Scatman John. Solo singing artists such as Alexia, Whigfield and DJ BoBo also contributed to the genre. Some acts like the Swedish dance-pop originated group Ace of Base use more pop vocals rather than rap/soul vocals along with Eurodance sound. Pop vocals were particularly popular in the late 1990s Eurodance productions. The Swedish group Rednex also introduced American country music elements into the sound.

Eurodance lyrics are almost always sung in English, regardless of the artist's nationalities. However, there are cases like in the Belgian group's Paradisio where Spanish lyrics are used along with latin music elements.

Almost all Eurodance emphasizes percussion and rhythm. The tempo is typically around 140 beats per minute, but may vary from 110 to 150.

Most Eurodance is very melody-driven. Most Eurodance songs are in minor keys, similarly to techno. This, along with positive lyrics, helps contribute to the overall powerful and emotional sound of Eurodance. Besides the contribution of the female or male vocals, there is often a noticeable use of rapid synthesizer arpeggios.

Popularity

In Europe

From the early to mid-1990s, Eurodance was popular in Europe; the style received extensive airplay on radio stations and television shows, resulting in many singles appearing in the charts. For example, in Italy there were seven singles in the top ten of the chart at the end of May 1995. Technotronic from Belgium had hits with ”Pump Up the Jam" and "Get Up" (featuring Ya Kid K). 

By 1996, the popularity of this genre had started to decline. From then, the classic Eurodance sound gradually morphed into progressive house. By 1997 and towards the end of the millennium house and trance music increased popularity over Eurodance in Europe's commercial, chart-oriented dance records. In the early 2000s, the mainstream music industry in Europe moved away from Eurodance in favour of other styles of dance music such as nu-disco, electro house, dance-pop and R&B.

Italy
Italo dance is an offshoot of the Eurodance music genre. One of the first examples is Black Box’s "Everybody Everybody" which climbed the charts and was a big hit in 1990. Italo Dance was popular in Italy in the late 1990s to the early 2000s and gained some popularity after the release of the single "Blue (Da Ba Dee)" by Eiffel 65. The genre had its infancy from 1993 to 1995 and its golden age from 1999 to 2005. Although Italo hits by Eiffel 65, Prezioso and Gabry Ponte still receive substantial airplay, the genre is far from mainstream today where it has been replaced by mostly electro and house music.

Italo dance is predominantly nightclub-oriented music and mainly produced in Italy. The genre never really became mainstream enough for the whole European market, but received much airplay on Italian radio, especially the dance radio station m2o, and in southern parts of Europe plus in the German speaking European countries.

United Kingdom
After Cappella's Gianfranco Bortolotti set up Media Records in Brescia, northern Italy to release his 'commercial European dance music' (a set-up which included fifteen studios featuring various production teams working almost non-stop on a huge number of records) he decided to take the label into other markets and set up a UK office in the UK. Run by Peter Pritchard and featuring many records by Stu Allan's British Eurodance act Clock, this record company would eventually turn into hard house label Nukleuz (known for its DJ Nation releases).

As Media turned into Nukleuz, it would fall to All Around the World Productions to be the label in the 21st Century which was more likely to release Eurodance tracks in the UK than other, with its Clubland TV music channel still having regular blocks of Eurodance videos in 2020 (though extending its scope to include hits by David Guetta as well as Cascada and Scooter)

North America

Canada

During the 1990s, Eurodance became popular in Canada, which produced its own variant called Candance (although it was mostly referred to as "Eurodance" or "dance music"). Eurodance received significant airplay on radio stations in the Greater Toronto Area such as Power 88.5, Energy 108 and Hot 103.5. Montreal was also a major Eurodance market, with MC Mario's famous radio show on Mix 96, called "Party Mix" and Bouge de là, a popular TV show on MusiquePlus. Beginning in mid-1992, Eurodance began to dominate the RPM dance chart in Canada, with acts such as 2 Unlimited, Snap!, Captain Hollywood Project, Culture Beat, Haddaway, Whigfield, each reaching number-one.

From approximately 1992 to 2000, Canadian acts such as Capital Sound, Love Inc., Jacynthe and Emjay had success with the Eurodance sound. The Toronto sound was more pop-oriented, while the Montreal one was more house-oriented.

United States
Eurodance is not well known in the United States outside of the major cities such as New York City, Los Angeles, Chicago, and Miami. Exemplifying this is the Eurodance classic "Scatman (Ski-Ba-Bop-Ba-Dop-Bop)", by Scatman John, an American artist; despite topping the charts in multiple European countries and reaching number 3 in the United Kingdom, it only reached as high as "number 60" on the US Hot 100. Another notable example is the Life in the Streets album, a combined Eurodance music project from American rapper Marky Mark and Caribbean reggae vocalist Prince Ital Joe, which was not released in the United States, but was a huge success in several European countries including singles like "Happy People" and "United" that topped the German charts.

A few Eurodance artists including 2 Unlimited, Haddaway, La Bouche and Ace of Base made the Rhythmic Top 40, Top 40 Mainstream and the Billboard Hot 100 during the early to mid-1990s. However, the sound tended to be more house and the rap-oriented artists received airplay. For instance, the German hip-house project Snap!, the Belgian hip-house project Technotronic and the Dutch techno dance project L.A. Style received quite a bit of airplay early on.

The more Hi-NRG-oriented artists were typically played only during special "mix" shows, and it was often necessary to go to a club to hear Eurodance music. While Eurodance did become popular with club DJs in the United States, radio stations were cautious about playing anything that sounded too much like disco during most of the 1980s and 1990s. By the end of the 1990s, however, some of the later acts such as Italian group Eiffel 65 and Danish group Aqua did receive extensive airplay.

Despite lack of widespread radio play, many Hi-NRG and Eurodance songs are popular at professional sporting events in the United States, especially ice hockey and basketball.

Compilation albums, such as the DMA Dance: Eurodance series of compilation albums (1995–1997) from Interhit Records and Dance Music Authority magazine, were popular and helped to define the genre as well as to make it accessible in the U.S. and Canada.

Hands Up 
Hands Up (also known as handz up! (stylized as HandzUp!) or dancecore in East Europe) is a style of trance music, and a derivation of Eurodance. The genre comes from its name, meaning music that requires listeners to "put their hands up", as well as fitness and danceability.

The genre developed in Germany in the mid- to late 1990s as part of the emerging trance music scene. Representatives of Eurodance such as Starsplash and Mark 'Oh are sometimes regarded as forerunners of Hands Up. The biggest commercial success was the music until the mid-2000s.

The synthesizer melodies are often catchy and simple. Often the vocal melody is accompanied by a synthesizer. In contrast to techno, short, high-pitched synthesizer tones are used. Hands Up does not rely on the structure of tension build-up, but rather is based on the typical verse-chorus pop music scheme. The main elements are the bassline, drums and a catchy lead sound. A typical stylistic device of Hands Up is pitched female or resulting feminine vocals, but male vocals are also common. In addition, distorted, autotuned, chopped and repeated spoken phrases are common characteristics.

See also
 Reggae fusion (Euro reggae)
 List of Eurodance artists
 List of Eurodance songs

References

External links
 EuroDanceHits.com
 Eurodance Magazine
 The Eurodance Encyclopedia, by Karine Sanche

 
1980s in music
1990s in music
2000s in music
Electronic dance music genres
Pop music genres
European music genres